Kate Elizabeth Pickett  (born 1965) is a British epidemiologist and political activist who is Professor of Epidemiology in the Department of Health Sciences at the University of York, and was a National Institute for Health and Care Research Career Scientist from 2007–2012. She co-authored (with Richard G. Wilkinson) The Spirit Level: Why More Equal Societies Almost Always Do Better and is a co-founder of The Equality Trust. Pickett was awarded a 2013 Silver Rose Award from Solidar for championing equality and the 2014 Charles Cully Memorial Medal by the Irish Cancer Society.

Career
Pickett was a commissioner for the York Fairness Commission and a commissioner for the Living Wage Commission.  She serves on the Scientific Council of Inequality Watch and the Scientific Board of Progressive Economy, and is a member of the Human Capital Research Working Group of the Institute for New Economic Thinking.  She is on the Steering Committee of the Alliance for Sustainability and Prosperity.

Background
Pickett trained in biological anthropology at Robinson College, Cambridge, nutritional science at Cornell University and epidemiology at the University of California Berkeley, where she received the Warren Winkelstein award for epidemiology. She is a Fellow of the Royal Society of Arts and a Fellow of the UK Faculty of Public Health.

Research
One programme of research focuses on the social determinants of health, including the influences of such factors as social class, income inequality, neighbourhood context and ethnic density on such varied outcomes as mortality and morbidity, teenage birth, obesity, Sudden Infant Death Syndrome and health-related behaviours. A second research agenda focuses on smoking in pregnancy, its causal role in relation to behavioural problems in children and its psychosocial context.

Politics
In August 2015, Pickett endorsed Jeremy Corbyn's campaign in the Labour Party leadership election.

Honours
Pickett was appointed Officer of the Order of the British Empire (OBE) in the 2023 New Year Honours for services to societal equality.

Selected bibliography

Books
 
 
 Adapted as the 2016 documentary film The Divide. Picket and Wilkinson each appear as commentators.

Journal articles

References

External links
 International Network for Research on Inequalities in Child Health Research Profile
 University of York Academic Profile

1965 births
British women epidemiologists
Living people
Place of birth missing (living people)
Academics of the University of York
British tax resisters